Spanish Lake, originally called Lake Flamand and then Lake Tasse, is located off of LA Hwy 182  in Iberia Parish and St. Martin Parish, Louisiana.

References

Lakes of Louisiana
Bodies of water of Iberia Parish, Louisiana
Bodies of water of St. Martin Parish, Louisiana